Clément Louis Marie Anne Belle (16 November 1722, Paris – 29 September 1806, Paris) was a French painter and tapestry designer.

Life and work
He was the son of Alexis Simon Belle, a well-known portrait painter and a Member of the Royal Academy of Painting and Sculpture in Paris and his wife, the painter and engraver Marie-Nicole Horthemels. Clément too showed a talent for art and was taught by his mother.

In 1745 he went to Italy, where he spent 10 years studying the old masters and on his return to Paris was accepted into the Academy. In 1765 he was appointed Deputy Professor and then Professor. In 1785 he was appointed Deputy Rector and then Rector.

In 1755 he was appointed head of the art section at the Gobelins Manufactory, an historic tapestry producer in Paris. Although he held the post for 30 years it did not prevent him creating paintings of his own.

He died in 1806. His son Augustin-Louis Belle succeeded him to his position at Gobelins.

Selected works
 Le Christ en Croix avec la Vierge et saint Jean, 1762, oil on canvas, 292 x 195 cm, Musée des beaux-arts de Dijon, Dijon. 
 Le Retour de l'enfant prodigue, musée Magnin, Dijon.
 Minerve remet à Hercule le decret qui a aboli les vices de l'ancien gouvernement, c.1790, oil on canvas, 36 x 39 cm, inventory no. INV 20297 A Louvre Museum Joconde website
 , c.1790, oil on canvas, 26 x 23 cm, inventory no. INV 20296 A Louvre Museum Joconde website
 La Convention nationale décrète l'abolition de la monarchie (entre 1788 et 1794), oil on canvas, Musée de la Révolution française, Vizille
La Convention nationale remet à la France le code des Lois républicaines (entre 1788 et 1794), oil on canvas, Musée de la Révolution française, Vizille

Selected paintings

References

 Pierre-Jean Mariette, Philippe de Chennevières et Anatole de Montaiglon, Archives de l'art français. Recueil de documents inédits relatifs à l'histoire des arts en France,  Paris, J.-B. Dumoulin, 1856, .
 Joseph-François Michaud et Louis-Gabriel Michaud, Biographie universelle, ancienne et moderne,  Paris, Madame C. Desplaces, 1854, .
 This article is based on the equivalent article on French Wikipedia

External links

 Joconde website

1722 births
1806 deaths
Artists from Paris
18th-century French painters